Beyond Nature is the title of a 1991 instrumental album by guitarist Phil Keaggy.

Track listing
All songs were written by Phil Keaggy, unless otherwise noted.

 "In the Light of Common Day"  – 3:52
 "County Down"  – 5:44
 "Symphonic Dance (Grieg, Op. 64)" (Edvard Grieg / Arranged by Keaggy)  – 5:44
 "Addison's Walk"  – 4:04
 "I Feel the Winds of God Today" (Traditional)  – 4:48
 "Fare Thee Well"  – 5:42
 "Fragile Forest"   – 4:24
 "Brother Jack"  – 4:54
 "As Warm as Tears"  – 6:05
 "A Place of Springs"  – 6:29
 "In the Light of Common Day (Reprise)"  – 4:11
 "When Night Falls"   – 4:08

Personnel

 Phil Keaggy – guitars, producer
 Stuart Duncan – fiddle
 Marianne Osiel – oboe
 Farrell Morris – percussion
 Kristin Wilkinson – viola
 Eberhard Ramm – French horn
 Mike Haynes – trumpet
 George Tidwell – trumpet
 Dennis Good – trombone
 Ralph Childs – tuba
 John Catchings – cello, viola
 Sam Levine – recorder, woodwinds, alto and bass flute
 Dave Davidson – violin
 Chris Teal – violin

Production
 JB – producer, engineer, mixing
 Don Hart – ensemble arrangements
 Digital Recorders, Studio D – recording location
 Javalina Recording Studios, Studio A – recording location
 Ben Pearson – photography

References 

1991 albums
Instrumental albums
Phil Keaggy albums